Mayella Mena (born June 1, 1988) is the Miss El Salvador Universe 2009, successor to Rebeca Moreno.

References

1988 births
Living people
Miss Universe 2009 contestants
Salvadoran beauty pageant winners